Shoals Christian School is a private, non-denominational Christian school in Florence, Alabama. The metropolitan area is commonly called "The Shoals". The headmaster, as of the 2021-2022 academic year, is Chuck Owens.  Shoals Christian School was formed in 1997 by the merger of two schools which were sponsored by then-Christ Chapel (now Chapel) and Woodmont Baptist Church. SCS graduated its first class of high school seniors in 2000. SCS is "double-accredited by Cognia (formerly SACS, then AdvancED) and the Association of Christian Schools International" and "our students score above the state and national average on the ACT" with "an average score of 23.7"  Florence, Alabama's TimesDaily newspaper named SCS "The Best-Kept Secret in The Shoals" in 2020 with 95% of students receiving scholarship and 99% of graduates attending college.

References

External links 
 

Christian schools in Alabama
Private schools in Alabama
Schools in Florence, Alabama
Nondenominational Christian schools in the United States